The Záncara is a 168 km long river in Castile-La Mancha, Spain. It is a tributary to the Guadiana. Its source is near the village Abia de la Obispalía, west of Cuenca, in the  Iberian System. The Záncara flows southwest, along the town of Socuéllamos. Its main tributaries are the Rus, Saona and Córcoles.

It flows into the Cigüela from the left near the Ojos del Guadiana, Villarrubia de los Ojos municipal term. There are authors though that claim that it is the Cigüela that flows into the Záncara.

See also 
 List of rivers of Spain

References

External links 
 Confederación hidrográfica del Guadiana

Rivers of Spain
Rivers of Castilla–La Mancha
Guadiana